Isaac Pawling House is a historic home located in East Fallowfield Township, Chester County, Pennsylvania. It was built about 1900, and is a two-story, seven-bay frame dwelling with a slate-covered hipped roof in the Queen Anne style.  It features a large, steep, conical turret, two-story bay window, and two-story hipped roof portico porch.  Its builder also built the Harry DeHaven House across the street.

It was added to the National Register of Historic Places in 1985.

References

Houses on the National Register of Historic Places in Pennsylvania
Queen Anne architecture in Pennsylvania
Houses completed in 1900
Houses in Chester County, Pennsylvania
National Register of Historic Places in Chester County, Pennsylvania